The Mixed team normal hill competition at the FIS Nordic World Ski Championships 2021 was held on 28 February 2021.

Results
The first round was started at 17:00 and the final round at 18:10.

References

Mixed team normal hill